Fern Park is a census-designated place and a suburban unincorporated community in Seminole County, Florida, United States. The population was 8,318 at the 2000 census. It is part of the Orlando–Kissimmee Metropolitan Statistical Area.

Geography

Demographics

As of the census of 2000, there were 8,318 people, 3,570 households, and 2,227 families residing in the CDP. The racial makeup of the CDP was 85.14% White, 7.54% African American, 0.42% Native American, 1.54% Asian, 0.01% Pacific Islander, 3.07% from other races, and 2.28% from two or more races. Hispanic or Latino of any race were 12.83% of the population.

There were 3,570 households, out of which 24.1% had children under the age of 18 living with them, 46.0% were married couples living together, 12.4% had a female householder with no husband present, and 37.6% were non-families. 30.3% of all households were made up of individuals, and 13.1% had someone living alone who was 65 years of age or older.  The average household size was 2.30 and the average family size was 2.85.

In the CDP, the population was spread out, with 20.3% under the age of 18, 8.4% from 18 to 24, 28.5% from 25 to 44, 24.5% from 45 to 64, and 18.3% who were 65 years of age or older.  The median age was 40 years. For every 100 females, there were 91.0 males.  For every 100 females age 18 and over, there were 87.5 males.

The median income for a household in the CDP was $43,337, and the median income for a family was $52,981. Males had a median income of $34,152 versus $25,975 for females. The per capita income for the CDP was $23,261.  About 4.2% of families and 7.8% of the population were below the poverty line, including 7.7% of those under age 18 and 10.8% of those age 65 or over.

Schools

Elementary
 English Estates Elementary School

References

External links
 Seminole County Convention and Visitors Bureau

Census-designated places in Seminole County, Florida
Unincorporated communities in Seminole County, Florida
Greater Orlando
Census-designated places in Florida
Unincorporated communities in Florida